The Territorial Council is the legislative branch of the government of the French territory of Saint Pierre and Miquelon. It was previously known as the General Council, but the name was changed to Territorial Council by a new French law on 22 February 2007, a law which also increased the council's powers. The council has 19 members, elected to five year terms. The last election was on 20 March 2022.

The Territorial Council building is a two-story structure located at Church Square in Saint-Pierre.

Organisation
The Territorial Council has 19 members, elected for a six-year term in single-seat constituencies. Elections are held in two stages. The first stage is open to all candidates and the majority of seats can only be given out if a political group achieves true majority at the ballot box. If no majority is attained on this ballot, a second ballot is held the following Sunday. On the second ballot, only a relative majority is necessary to obtain 11 out of the 19 seats. The rest of the seats (4 reserved for Miquelon) are distributed through a system of proportional representation.

President
The president of the Territorial Council has held executive power since March 2, 1982. The current president is Stéphane Artano.

A list of presidents of the Territorial Council (General Council before February 2007):

 Jan 1947 – Feb 1952 Henri Dagort
 Feb 1952 – Nov 1956 Alfred-Léon Briand 
 Nov 1956 – Nov 1964 Henri Claireaux         
 Nov 1964 – Oct 1966 Albert Briand 
 Oct 1966 – Jun 1968 Paul Lebailly
 Jun 1968 – 4 Oct 1984 Albert Pen
 4 Oct 1984 – 1 Apr 1994 Marc Plantegenest
 1 Apr 1994 – 6 Jul 1996 Gérard Grignon
 6 Jul 1996 – 31 Mar 2000 Bernard Le Soavec
 31 Mar 2000 – 27 Dec 2005 Marc Plantegenest
 27 Dec 2005 – 27 Jan 2006 Paul Jaccachury
 27 Jan 2006 – 31 Mar 2006 Charles Dodeman
 31 Mar 2006 – 24 Oct 2017 Stéphane Artano
 24 Oct 2017 – 13 Oct 2020 Stéphane Lenormand
 13 Oct 2020 – current Bernard Briand

Territorial Council Members
The Territorial Council members consist of 5 vice-presidents, officers of the council and general members.

The current standing at the council are:

 First Vice President (Premier Vice-Président) - Jean-Yves Desdouets
 Second Vice President (Deuxième Vice-Présidente) - Catherine Hélène
 Third Vice President (Troisième Vice-Président) - Olivier Detcheverry
 Fourth Vice President (Quatrième Vice-Présidente) - Catherine De Arburn
 Fifth Vice President (Cinquième Vice-Président) - Claude Lemoine

Majority Territorial Council Members
 Stéphane Artano
 Joane Beaupertuis
 Sandy Skinner
 Stéphane Lenormand
 Jean-Pierre Lebailly
 Valérie Perrin
 Jean-Louis Dagort
 Carole Sérignat
 Virginie Sabarots
 Michel Detcheverry
 Claire Vigneaux

Opposition Territorial Council Members
 Matthew Reardon
 Tatiana Vigneau-Urtizbéréa

See also
 Municipal governments in Saint Pierre and Miquelon
 Territorial Council of Saint Barthélemy

External links 
 Archipel demain
 Cap sur l'avenir
 Saint-Pierre & Miquelon Information
 Saint-Pierre & Miquelon Community website, includes political discussions

 

Legislatures of Overseas France
Government of Saint Pierre and Miquelon
Politics of Saint Pierre and Miquelon
Saint Pierre and Miquelon